Kurt Wegener (April 3, 1878 in Berlin  - February 29, 1964 in Munich) was a German polar explorer and meteorologist.

He was the brother of Alfred Wegener. He worked at the Meteorological Observatory Lindenberg near Beeskow with his brother.

References

1878 births
1964 deaths
German polar explorers
German meteorologists
Tectonicists